Sadrametsa is a settlement in Rõuge Parish, Võru County in southeastern Estonia.

References

Villages in Võru County